Marian Panchyshyn,  (1882 in Lviv, Austria-Hungary - October 9, 1943 in Munich, Germany) was a Ukrainian medical doctor and public figure. He was both member of a healing organization, and vice-president of the Ukrainian Republic proclaimed on June 30, 1941.

Medical career
Markian Panchyshyn was a member of the social network "Narodna Lichnytsia" ({lang-ua:Народна Лічниця}).

Panchyshyn was considered to be the most popular doctor in Western Ukraine.

Role in the 1941 Ukrainian State Administration
Because of his medical prowess, Panchyshyn was elected as Minister of Health of Ukrainian State Administration on June 30, 1941.

Unfortunately, this did not survive the persecution of the Nazis. He was forced to flee into exile, with other members of the Ukrainian government.

Death
Marian Panchyshyn died in Munich, Germany, on October 9, 1943.

See also 
 https://web.archive.org/web/20110714010654/http://www.lvivbest.com/en/museums/museum-history-galicia-medicine-named-after-maryan-panchyshyn
 http://www.lvivcenter.org/poi.php?poiid=1&ci_narrativeid=

References

1882 births
1943 deaths
Physicians from Lviv
Ukrainian Austro-Hungarians
People from the Kingdom of Galicia and Lodomeria
University of Lviv alumni
Ukrainian collaborators with Nazi Germany
Ukrainian independence activists
Ukrainian medical doctors
Members of the Shevchenko Scientific Society